"Sweet Dream Woman" is a song written by Chip Taylor and Al Gorgoni, and recorded by American country music artist Waylon Jennings.  Jennings cut the song in September and October 1971 at RCA Studios in Nashville, with Ronny Light producing. That recording was released in June 1972 as the second single from the album Good Hearted Woman. The song reached number 7 on the Billboard Hot Country Singles & Tracks chart.

Personnel
Waylon Jennings — vocals, guitar
Fred Carter Jr. — guitar
Dale Sellers — guitar
Chip Young — guitar
Ralph Mooney — steel guitar
Andy McMahon — organ
Bobby Dyson, Henry Strzelecki — bass
Kenny Buttrey, Buddy Harman — drums
Dolores Edgin, Ginger Holladay, June Page, Temple Riser — vocals

Chart performance

References

1972 singles
Waylon Jennings songs
Songs written by Chip Taylor
RCA Records singles
Songs written by Al Gorgoni
1972 songs